Per Erik Wallqvist (7 September 1797 in Stockholm – 16 February 1855) was a Swedish ballet dancer and ballet master. Wallqvist was the ballet master of the Royal Swedish Ballet at the Royal Swedish Opera in Stockholm between 1827 and 1833.

References 
  

1797 births
1855 deaths
Swedish male ballet dancers
19th-century Swedish ballet dancers
Ballet masters